The tornado outbreak of June 16–18, 2014, was a tornado outbreak concentrated in the Great Plains and the Midwestern United States. Two tornadoes also occurred in Ontario. The severe weather event most significantly affected the state of Nebraska, where twin EF4 tornadoes  killed two and critically injured twenty others in and around the town of Pilger on the evening of June 16. The two Pilger tornadoes were part of a violent tornado family that produced four EF4 tornadoes and was broadcast live on television. The outbreak went on to produce multiple other strong tornadoes across the northern Great Plains states throughout the next two days.

Meteorological synopsis

On June 13, 2014, the SPC noted the possibility of severe weather associated with potential mesoscale convective systems in the northern United States for June 16–18. However, the predictability of this event was too low for the SPC to designate areas as under risk of severe weather. The following day, the SPC revised their forecasts, indicating a slight risk for severe activity for areas around the confluence of the Big Sioux and Missouri rivers two days before the eventual tornado outbreak. The development of a low-pressure area and increasing atmospheric instability were expected to be contributing factors.  Forecasts remained relatively unchanged on June 15, though the probability for "significant severe weather" was predicted for a large area of northern Iowa and adjacent areas.

The morning of June 16 was marked only by isolated storms in the Nebraska area with only marginal severe weather. Beginning at around 0800 UTC, however, favorable conditions for severe weather, particularly for large hail, began to build across central Nebraska. Moisture from the Gulf of Mexico began to make its way into southern Nebraska and over Kansas, raising dew points over the region. In addition, the prevalence of altocumulus castellanus clouds was an indicator for additional severe weather later in the day. The flow of moisture into the region was further enhanced by an eastward progressing warm front, and at 1200 UTC on June 16, the SPC once again issued a slight risk for severe weather for the eastern halves of South Dakota, Nebraska, and extending eastward into the western Great Lakes region. This was followed shortly after by the day's first severe thunderstorm watch, issued for primarily eastern Nebraska in response to a developing line of supercells. An hour later, the SPC upgraded some areas previously under a slight risk for severe weather to a moderate risk as a result of continuously increasing moisture content and CAPE in the atmosphere. At 1613 UTC, the SPC issued the first of three public severe weather outlooks for the day, covering a region centered on Sioux City, Iowa. A Particularly Dangerous Situation tornado watch was issued later that afternoon, and a powerful cyclic supercell developed in Nebraska. This supercell went on to produce a family of six tornadoes, including four EF4s that affected areas in and around Stanton, Pilger, and Wakefield, Nebraska. Two fatalities occurred in or near Pilger and much of the town was destroyed. Later that evening, two tornadoes (rated EF1 and EF2) struck the town of Platteville, Wisconsin simultaneously, resulting in major damage.

Before tornado activity continued on the 17th, a man died due to straight line winds in Iowa. An early morning EF3 causing major damage to homes and an elementary school in Verona, Wisconsin, and an EF2 from the same storm causing damage in residential areas of Madison.
Later that day, an EF3 tornado caused significant damage in rural areas of Carter County, Montana near the Custer National Forest. A large EF2 tornado also caused damage to numerous homes in Angus and Barrie, Ontario. Later that evening, multiple large wedge tornadoes were reported near the towns of Coleridge and Laurel, Nebraska. One of these tornadoes caused EF3 damage to farms and trees outside of Coleridge. 

On the night of June 18, an EF2 tornado hit the South Dakota town of Wessington Springs, trapping some of its residents in their homes. 43 homes and 12 businesses in town were damaged or destroyed. Another pair of twin tornadoes were also reported, near the South Dakota community of Crow Lake. A large multiple-vortex tornado completely destroyed a farm near the town of Alpena later that evening. That tornado was rated an EF4, the fifth of the outbreak sequence.

Confirmed tornadoes

June 16

June 17

June 18

Pilger tornado family

This violent tornado family was spawned by a powerful cyclic supercell thunderstorm that affected five counties in northeastern Nebraska. Six tornadoes touched down as a result of this supercell, four of which were rated EF4.

The first tornado, which was rated EF0, touched down briefly in an open field near Stanton, causing no damage. After this tornado dissipated, another tornado touched down southwest of Stanton, initially snapping trees and power poles at EF0 to EF1 intensity as it moved northeast. As the tornado passed west of Stanton and grew into a large wedge, barns were destroyed and swept away at EF2 intensity and power poles were snapped. Two homes were leveled at high-end EF3 intensity in this area as well. Farther north of town, the tornado weakened slightly to EF2 strength as a house had its roof torn off, a semi-truck was flipped, and several outbuildings were destroyed. The tornado then re-intensified dramatically near the Maskenthine Reservoir, reaching EF4 strength. Two farmhouses were swept away, and multiple trees were debarked in this area. A car and a pickup truck were lofted and thrown over a quarter mile, both of which were mangled beyond recognition. The tornado maintained EF4 strength as it crossed N-57, sweeping away a house and a barn, and debarking additional trees. Another barn was destroyed at EF2 strength before the tornado roped out and dissipated.

After the Stanton tornado lifted, a new tornado touched down southwest of Pilger. The tornado was initially weak, damaging trees, power poles, and outbuildings. The tornado intensified as it approached town, and barns and outbuildings were leveled or swept away at EF2 intensity. The tornado then became violent, striking Pilger directly at EF4 strength, killing one person, injuring many others, and damaging or destroying most structures in town. This led to Nebraska’s first tornado fatality since 2004. As the main Pilger tornado was approaching town, a second nearly identical tornado developed east of town and paralleled the path of the main tornado, causing minor tree and outbuilding damage. Numerous homes and businesses in Pilger were completely destroyed, with several leveled or swept away. Numerous brick buildings in the downtown area were heavily damaged or destroyed, and trees throughout the town were denuded and debarked. A granary was destroyed, multiple cars were thrown and mangled, and a school building had much of its top floor destroyed. A church was completely leveled and partially swept away as the tornado exited the town. Past Pilger, the twin tornadoes continued northeast, with the main tornado debarking several trees at EF3 strength and tearing the roofs off of two homes, while the other tornado damaged several farms at EF2 strength and snapped multiple trees. Both tornadoes grew in size as the damage paths shifted closer to each other. The main Pilger tornado destroyed outbuildings and snapped trees and power poles at EF2 strength, while the other tornado reached EF3 strength, snapping a metal transmission pole, destroying several barns, and inflicting EF1 damage to a house at the edge of the path. Both tornadoes then reached EF4 strength simultaneously as the paths crossed. Numerous trees were completely debarked in this area, and two farm homes were swept away with only the basements remaining. One of these two homes was hit by both tornadoes. Vehicles were lofted in this area, over 300 head of cattle were killed, and a fatality occurred as the second tornado tossed a car from a road. After the tornadoes crossed paths, the second tornado veered to the north and destroyed an outbuilding and tore the roof and some walls from a house at EF2 strength before lifting. The main Pilger tornado continued to the northeast, snapping trees and sweeping away another home at EF4 strength. The main tornado then veered and moved almost due east, destroying two outbuildings as it roped out and dissipated.

The fifth tornado spawned by this supercell touched down as the main Pilger tornado was dissipating. This large wedge tornado quickly reached EF4 strength soon after touching down, moving east as it cleanly swept away a farm home. Further east, a large metal electrical transmission truss tower was toppled at EF3 intensity. The main Pilger tornado was seen roping out and rotating around the perimeter of this new tornado as it developed. The tornado then weakened somewhat as it veered sharply to the north, destroying outbuildings and toppling power poles at EF2 intensity. Continuing due-north, the tornado maintained EF2 strength as it tore roofs off of multiple homes and destroyed numerous barns and outbuildings. The tornado then re-strengthened to EF4 intensity as it crossed 854th Rd, sweeping away several farm homes at that location and debarking multiple trees. The tornado then weakened back to EF2 strength and became rain-wrapped as it passed east of Wakefield, destroying outbuildings, snapping trees and power poles, and tearing roofs off of homes at EF1 to EF2 strength before dissipating north of town. After the Wakefield tornado dissipated, the supercell continued to the northeast, producing a sixth and final EF0 tornado that briefly touched down in an open field near the town of Hubbard, causing no damage.

See also
List of North American tornadoes and tornado outbreaks
Tornadoes of 2014
List of United States tornadoes from June to July 2014

Notes

References

External links
 
 
 
 
 

2014-06-16
2014-06-16
2014-06-16
2014-06-16
2014-06-16
2014 in Nebraska
2014 in Iowa
2014 in South Dakota
2014 in Wisconsin
2014 meteorology
Stanton County, Nebraska
2014-06-16
June 2014 events in the United States